Solmi is a surname. Notable people with the surname include:

Arrigo Solmi (1873–1944), Italian scholar and politician
Federico Solmi (born 1973), Italian visual artist
Sergio Solmi (1899–1981), Italian poet, essayist, and literary critic

See also
Park Sol-mi (born 1978), South Korean actress
Soli (disambiguation)

Italian-language surnames